Peder Jönsson (died 1640), was a Swedish hunter and fisherman from Söderköping, who was executed for having confessed to sexual intercourse with a Sjörå (a lake-nymph; a mythical female creature of the lake). Though they are other cases of the same kind in 17th-century Sweden, his was the only case were the sentence is confirmed to have been executed.

Jönsson was from Söderköping, where he was employed as a member of the staff at a church. In 1640, his wife alerted the authorities about him. Before the court, he admitted to having had called upon the sjörå with a magic chant. She appeared to him as a beautiful woman with horsetail, feet like a cow and legs with fur. She promised him good fortune in hunting and fishing. In exchange, he would provide her with sex and refuse his wife in bed. He agreed. The wife of Jönsson confirmed his story. This story was interpreted as witchcraft by the authorities, and Peder Jönsson was sentenced to death by the local court. His sentence was confirmed by the high court, and he was thereby executed. Though his case is not the only one in the 17th-century Sweden where a human is sentenced to death for having had sex with a mythological creature (not counting Satan or a demon), his is the only sentence confirmed to have been executed.

See also
 Karin Svensdotter
 Sven Andersson (farmworker)

Notes

References
 Häll, Mikael: "Den övernaturliga älskarinnan - Erotiska naturväsen och äktenskapet i 1600-talets Sverige", i Dygder och laster - Förmoderna perspektiv på tillvaron, Catharina Stenqvist och Marie Lindstedt Cronberg (red.), Nordic Academic Press, Lund (2010)
 Helmfrid, Björn: Söderköping: Tiden 1568-1690, S:t Ragnhilds Gille, Söderköping (2001), s. 253

1640 deaths
17th-century Swedish people
17th-century executions by Sweden
1640 in law
1640 crimes
People from Söderköping Municipality
People executed for witchcraft